Quill Inc is a branded podcast agency. 
It was founded by Fatima Zaidi in Toronto, CA, and offers production services.

History 
In 2019, Fatima Zaidi left Toronto PR firm, Eighty-Eight. In the same year, Zaidi founded Quill. Quill started as a marketplace for creators who are looking for podcast freelancers.  During this time, Zaidi and the Quill team produced podcasts for North American brands. In 2020, Quill pivoted to focus solely on audio production as a Canadian podcast agency. In 2022, Quill launched CoHost, a podcast hosting and analytics platform built for brands and agencies. In 2020, Quill acquired Origins Media Haus, a boutique branded podcast agency founded by Stephanie Andrews, Alison Osborne, and Brittany Nguyen. With this acquisition, Quill onboarded all Origins Media Haus employees including Stephanie Andrews who became Quill’s Head of Production (currently Quill’s Director of Product), Alison Osborne who became Quill’s Head of Marketing (currently Quill’s Director of Growth Marketing), and Brittany Nguyen who became Quill’s Head of Sound & Technical Production (currently Quill’s Head of Sound Engineering & Product Design).

Branded podcasts  
Expedia Group Main Article: Powering Travel
TD Bank Main Article: C Suite
CIBC Main Article: CIBC Innovation Banking 
Amdocs Main Article: The Great Indoors and Point of View
Heart and Stroke Foundation  Main Article: The Beat

SickKids Foundation Main Article: SickKids VS
Axway Main Article:  Transform it Forward

Quill Podcast Awards  

In 2021, Quill launched the Quill Podcast Awards, a yearly digital awards ceremony. Award categories feature both podcast companies and creators including, Podcast of the Year, Host of the Year, Branded Podcast of the Year, Best New Company, Best Podcast Tech, and Innovator of the Year. 

Previous winners include HeadGum, Castbox, and The New York Times podcast, The Daily (podcast).

References

External links  

Canadian podcasts